This article is a list of Summit League conference champions.  The Summit League sponsors 19 sports, nine men's and 10 women's and no longer sponsors football. This article is updated through the 2022 women's volleyball championship, completed on November 26.

Sports sponsored

Men's

Women's

Membership

Current members
Source:
 Denver Pioneers (2013–present)
 Kansas City Roos (1994–2013, 2020–present)
 Represents the University of Missouri–Kansas City, whose athletic program was known as the UMKC Kangaroos from the school's joining the University of Missouri System in 1963 through the 2018–19 school year.
 North Dakota Fighting Hawks (2018–present)
 North Dakota State Bison (2007–present)
 Omaha Mavericks (2012–present)
 Oral Roberts Golden Eagles (1997–2012, 2014–present)
 St. Thomas Tommies (2021–present)
 South Dakota Coyotes (2011–present)
 South Dakota State Jackrabbits (2007–present)
 Western Illinois Leathernecks (1982–present)

Current affiliate members
Years listed here are the calendar years of arrival. For schools which are members only in spring sports (such as baseball), the year of arrival precedes the first season of competition. 
 Drake Bulldogs (men's tennis, 2017–present)
 Eastern Illinois Panthers (women's swimming and diving, 2006–present; men's swimming and diving, 2006–present; men's soccer, 2011–present)
 Illinois State Redbirds (men's tennis, 2017–present)
 Lindenwood Lions (men's soccer, men's and women's swimming & diving, 2022–present)
 Northern Colorado Bears (baseball, 2021–present)
 Southern Indiana Screaming Eagles (men's soccer, men's and women's swimming & diving, 2022–present)

Former members
Source:
 Akron Zips (1990–1992)
 Buffalo Bulls (1994–1998)
 Centenary Gentlemen and Ladies (2003–2011)
 Central Connecticut State Blue Devils (1994–1997)
 Chicago State Cougars (1994–2006)
 Cleveland State Vikings (1982–1994)
 Eastern Illinois Panthers (1982–1996)
 IUPUI Jaguars (1998–2017)
 Northeastern Illinois Golden Eagles (1994–1998)
 Northern Illinois Huskies (1990–1994)
 Northern Iowa Panthers (1982–1991)
 Oakland Golden Grizzlies (1998–2013)
 Purdue Fort Wayne Mastodons (2007–2020)
 The Purdue Fort Wayne athletic program originally represented Indiana University – Purdue University Fort Wayne (IPFW), and was branded as "IPFW" through the 2015–16 school year, after which it adopted the "Fort Wayne" branding. After the 2017–18 school year, IPFW was dissolved and replaced by two new institutions—Indiana University Fort Wayne, with no athletic program, and Purdue University Fort Wayne, which inherited the IPFW athletic program.  Purdue Fort Wayne left the Summit League in July 2020 to join the Horizon League.
 Southern Utah Thunderbirds (1997–2012)
 Southwest Missouri State Bears (1982–1990)
 Troy State Trojans (1994–1997)
 UIC Flames (1982–1994)
 Valparaiso Crusaders (1982–2007)
 While Valparaiso's nickname is now Beacons, the nickname was Crusaders during the school's tenure in the Summit League, both as a full member and as an associate. 
 Wisconsin–Green Bay Phoenix (1982–1994)
 Wisconsin–Milwaukee Panthers (1993–1994)
 Wright State Raiders (1991–1994)
 Youngstown State Penguins (1992–2001)

Former affiliate members
 C. W. Post Pioneers (Baseball associate 1995–1998)
 DePaul Blue Demons (Softball associate 1993–1999)
 Howard Bison (Men's soccer associate 1996–1998)
 NYIT Bears (Baseball associate 1995–1998)
 Oneonta State Red Dragons (Men's soccer associate 1996–1997)
 Oral Roberts Golden Eagles (Men's soccer associate, 2012–2013; returned to full membership in 2014)
 Pace Setters (Baseball associate 1995–1998)
 Quincy Hawks (Men's soccer associate 1994–1995)
 SIU Edwardsville Cougars  (Men's soccer associate 1994–1995)
 South Dakota Coyotes (Men's and women's swimming and diving associate 2010–2011)
 South Dakota State Jackrabbits (Men's and women's swimming and diving associate 2006–2008)
 Valparaiso Crusaders (men's swimming, 2017–2021; men's tennis; 2017–2020)

Baseball 

Division titles are counted as a full regular season championship. Current Summit League members Denver, Kansas City, North Dakota, and South Dakota have never sponsored baseball while in the conference.

Of former Summit members, IUPUI added baseball in the 1994 season but dropped the sport after 2001; Wisconsin–Milwaukee only participated in league play in the 1994 season, its final one in the conference; Oakland did not participate in league play during the 1999 season, its first as a conference member; and Buffalo and Wisconsin–Green Bay never sponsored baseball while in the Summit.

Basketball (men's) 

All current Summit members have sponsored men's basketball throughout their tenures in the conference.

Among former members, Cleveland State was suspended from conference play in men's basketball during the 1988–89 and 1989–90 seasons, and Oakland didn't compete in conference play during the 1998–99 season, its first as a Summit member.

Seasons are listed by the calendar years in which they ended.

Basketball (women's) 

All current Summit members have sponsored women's basketball throughout their tenures in the conference.

Among former members, Oakland didn't compete in conference play during the 1998–99 season, its first as a Summit member.

Seasons are listed by the calendar years in which they ended.

Cross country (men's) 
All current Summit members sponsor men's cross country except Denver and Omaha.

Several former conference members did not continuously sponsor the sport while in the league. Northern Illinois never sponsored men's cross country while a Summit member. Cleveland State sponsored the sport when it joined, but dropped men's cross country after 1992. Wisconsin–Green Bay did not have a score in the 1982 cross country meet. Valparaiso did not participate in the 1984 cross country meet. UIC did not have a score in the 1986 cross country meet and Eastern Illinois did not participate.

Cross country (women's) 
All current Summit members except Denver sponsor women's cross country.

Among former conference members, the only one that never sponsored cross country while in the Summit was Northern Illinois.

Football 
Football was sponsored by the conference from 1982–84. Members of the conference went on to form the league now known as the Missouri Valley Football Conference.

Golf (men's) 
All current Summit League members sponsor men's golf.

Among former members, Buffalo, UIC, and Wisconsin–Milwaukee did not sponsor men's golf in the Summit League. Valparaiso dropped men's golf after 1999.

Since NCAA golf is a spring sport, the first season of competition for each school is the calendar year after said school either joined the conference or added men's golf, as applicable.

Golf (women's) 
All current Summit League members sponsor women's golf.

Among former members, Valparaiso never sponsored women's golf while a member, and Chicago State dropped women's golf after 2000.

Soccer (men's) 
Among current Summit League members, the four schools from the Dakotas (North Dakota, North Dakota State, South Dakota, South Dakota State) do not sponsor men's soccer. Although Oral Roberts left the Summit League for the Southland Conference in 2012, it remained a men's soccer affiliate until returning to full Summit League membership in 2014. Eastern Illinois, which had been a full conference member through the 1995 soccer season, returned as a men's soccer affiliate in 2011. Lindenwood and Southern Indiana became men's soccer affiliates in the 2022 season.

Among former Summit members, Chicago State, Northern Iowa, Southern Utah, Troy State (now Troy), and Youngstown State did not sponsor men's soccer while in the conference. Valparaiso first sponsored men's soccer in 1988, Southwest Missouri State (now Missouri State) began playing soccer in the conference in 1989, and Oakland did not compete in conference play during its first season as a member in 1998.

Soccer (women's) 
Since the Summit League began sponsoring women's soccer in 1999, all current Summit League members have sponsored women's soccer throughout their conference tenures except Kansas City, which did not sponsor women's soccer until 2009.

Among former Summit members present during the existence of a women's soccer championship, only Chicago State never sponsored women's soccer while a member.

Softball 
Since the Summit League began sponsoring softball in the 1993 season (1992–93 school year), the only current Summit members that have never sponsored the sport are Denver and Oral Roberts.

Among former members that were present during the era of Summit League softball, Buffalo, Chicago State, and Wisconsin–Milwaukee did not sponsor softball during their conference tenures.

Swimming and diving (men's) 
As of 2022–23, only five full Summit members sponsor men's swimming & diving: Denver, St. Thomas, South Dakota, South Dakota State, and Western Illinois. Of these schools, two began participating as affiliate members before becoming part of the core conference membership. South Dakota State was an affiliate in 2005–06 and 2006–07, and South Dakota was an affiliate in 2009–10 and 2010–11. No other full members have ever sponsored the sport while in the conference.

Eastern Illinois, which had sponsored the sport throughout its tenure as a full Summit member (ending in 1996), rejoined as a swimming & diving affiliate from the 2005–06 season. Lindenwood and Southern Indiana joined as swimming & diving affiliates in 2022–23.

Among former Summit members, Akron, Chicago State, Purdue Fort Wayne, Southern Utah, Troy State, and Youngstown State never sponsored men's swimming & diving while in the conference. Cleveland State and Valparaiso didn't sponsor men's swimming & diving until 1992–93, and Centenary didn't sponsor the sport until 2004–05. Valparaiso rejoined as a swimming & diving affiliate, although with only swimmers and no divers, beginning in the 2017–18 season, leaving after the 2020–21 season for single-sport membership in the Mid-American Conference.

In the tables below, seasons are denoted by the calendar years in which they ended.

Swimming and diving (women's) 
Among current Summit members, Kansas City, North Dakota, North Dakota State, and Oral Roberts do not sponsor women's swimming & diving.

Both South Dakota schools began participating as affiliate members in swimming & diving before becoming part of the core conference membership; each joined for both men's and women's competition at the same time. South Dakota State competed in 2005–06 and 2006–07, and South Dakota in 2009–10 and 2010–11.

The current roster of Summit women's swimming & diving members as of 2022–23 also includes Eastern Illinois, Lindenwood, and Southern Indiana. EIU added women's swimming & diving in 1992–93 and competed in the Summit through 1995–96, and rejoined as swimming & diving affiliates in 2005 (2005–06 season). Lindenwood and Southern Indiana joined for swimming & diving in 2022–23.

Among former members, Chicago State, Purdue Fort Wayne, Southern Utah, and Troy did not sponsor women's swimming and diving while Summit League members. Youngstown State didn't sponsor women's swimming and diving until the 1997 school year. Centenary didn't sponsor women's swimming and diving until the 2005 school year.

Tennis (men's) 
Men's tennis began crowning a regular season champion in 1998. Among current Summit members, North Dakota State, St. Thomas, South Dakota, and Western Illinois do not sponsor men's tennis. North Dakota State, St. Thomas, and South Dakota have never sponsored the sport as Summit members, and Western Illinois dropped it after the 2015–16 season.

Drake and Illinois State have been men's tennis affiliates since 2017–18.

Among former members, Oakland and Southern Utah never sponsored men's tennis while in the league, Cleveland State dropped men's tennis after the 1991–92 season, and Purdue Fort Wayne (then IPFW) dropped the sport after the 2014–15 season. Valparaiso sponsored men's tennis throughout its tenure as a full member, and returned as a men's tennis affiliate in 2017–18, but dropped the sport after the 2019–20 season.

* Overall record. The Summit League did not play a conference regular season schedule.

Tennis (women's) 
Women's tennis began crowning a regular season champion in 1999. An X denotes never competing in a season in which a regular-season championship was awarded.

Among current Summit members, only North Dakota State does not sponsor women's tennis, having never sponsored that sport while a Summit member.

Track and field (men's) 
Seasons are listed by the calendar years in which they ended. Schools without the indoor and outdoor designation competed in those years in both indoor and outdoor. All current Summit members sponsor men's track and field except Denver and Omaha; all currently sponsoring schools have done so throughout their conference tenures.

Among former Summit members, Centenary, Northeastern Illinois, Northern Illinois, Wisconsin–Green Bay, and Wisconsin–Milwaukee did not sponsor men's track and field while in the conference. Cleveland State didn't participate in the 1990 indoor track and field championship. Valparaiso began sponsoring men's track and field in 1996, Oakland did the same in 2006, and IUPUI started sponsoring only the outdoor form of the sport in 2013. Purdue Fort Wayne dropped the sport while an NCAA Division II member in 2005 and did not reinstate it until the 2019–20 season, its last as a Summit member.

Indoor

Outdoor

Track and field (women's) 
Seasons are listed by the calendar years in which they ended; for example, the 2001–02 school year is listed as 2002. Schools without the indoor and outdoor designation competed in those years in both indoor and outdoor.

Among current Summit members, only Denver does not sponsor women's track and field.

Among former members, Valparaiso started its women's track and field program in 1996, Oakland did the same in 2006, and IUPUI started sponsoring only the outdoor form of the sport in 2013. Centenary and Northeastern Illinois never sponsored women's track and field while conference members.

Indoor

Outdoor

Volleyball 
Division titles count as full regular season titles.

All current Summit League members have sponsored women's volleyball during their respective tenures in the conference. The conference has never sponsored men's volleyball, and no current full member has a men's program.

Among former members, Oakland did not participate in Summit League volleyball until the 1999 season, and Southern Utah did not join Summit League women's volleyball until 2009.

References

External links
 Summit League website

Championships
Summit League